The 1938 Singapore Open, also known as the 1938 Singapore Badminton Championships, took place from 13 August – 3 December 1938 at the Clerical Union Hall in Balestier, Singapore. The ties were played over a few months with the first round ties being played on the 13th of August and the last (women's singles final) was played on the 3rd of December. There were no women's doubles and mixed doubles competition due to the lack of entries.

Venue
Clerical Union Hall

Final results

References 

Singapore Open (badminton)
1938 in badminton